1952 Albanian Cup was the sixth season of Albania's annual cup competition. It began in February 1952 with the First Eliminatory Round and ended in May 1952 with the Final match. Dinamo Tirana were the defending champions, having won their second Albanian Cup last season. The cup was won by Dinamo Tirana.

The rounds were played in a one-legged format. Group A played three eliminatory rounds and Groups B, C and D played directly in quarter finals. If the number of goals was equal, the match was decided by extra time and a penalty shootout, if necessary.

First eliminatory round
Games were played on February, 1952.

Group A:

|}

Second eliminatory round
Games were played on February, 1952.

Group A:

|}
+ Puna Elbasan won by corners.

Third eliminatory round
Games were played on March, 1952.

Group A:

|}

Quarter-finals
Games were played on March, 1952.

Group A:

|}

Group B:

|}

Group C:

|}

Group D:

|}

Semi-finals
In this round entered the four winners from the previous round.

|}

Final

References

 Calcio Mondiale Web

External links
 Official website 

Cup
1952 domestic association football cups
1952